From Reverence to Rape: The Treatment of Women in the Movies is a 1974 book (revised and reissued in 1987 and 2016) by feminist film critic Molly Haskell (born 1939).  It was one of the first books to chronicle women's images in film. Along with Marjorie Rosen's Popcorn Venus and Joan Mellen's Women and Their Sexuality in the New Film, it typifies the first feminist expeditions into film history and criticism, adopting the "image of woman" approach. Haskell compared the portrayal of women on-screen to real life women off-screen to determine if the representation of women in Hollywood cinema was accurate. Later developments in feminist film theory have partially rejected Haskell's and Rosen's approach as rudimentary.

"The Woman's Film"

One particularly influential chapter in From Reverence to Rape discusses the genre of the "woman's film".

As Haskell points out, woman's film could be a compensation for "all the dominated universes from which she has been excluded: the gangster film, the Western, the war film, the policier, the rodeo film, the adventure film." A woman's film is also more self-pitying in comparison to the male adventure film which Raymond Durgnat calls the "male weepies." The man's film abstracts the times before settling down, when men were battling nature or the enemy. Marriage becomes the killjoy. "All the excitement of life occurs outside of marriage.  At a soap opera level, which Haskell considers the lowest level, a woman's film "fills a masturbatory need, it is soft-core emotional porn for the frustrated housewife."  These "weepies" are focused on "self-pity and tears, to accept, rather than reject".

Woman's film characters
Three types of women characters appear in the woman's film, according to Haskell:
The Extraordinary woman
For example, characters played by Katharine Hepburn and Bette Davis.
These women portray strong, powerful figures.
The Ordinary woman
These women are common, passive, and often a victim. 
They are precursors to soap opera characters.
The Ordinary who becomes extraordinary woman.
The victims who rise, or endure.

Woman's film themes 
Haskell contends, "The domestic and the romantic are entwined, one redeeming the other, in the theme of self-sacrifice, which is the mainstay and oceanic force, high tide and low ebb, of the woman's film".

Sacrifice:
A woman must sacrifice herself for her children.
Her children for their own welfare.
Marriage for her lover.
Her lover for marriage or for his own welfare.
Her career for love.
Love for her career.

In the 1930s and 1940s most films end tragically.

Affliction:
Women holds a secret. An illness or disease.
Martyrdom is proportionate to guilt.
Choice:
Normally two suitors.
Commonly the male is only curable by "her."  The man is a clergyman or confirmed bachelor.
Competition:
The heroine must do battle with the woman whose (husband, fiance, lover) she loves.

References

1974 non-fiction books
Books about film
Books about rape
Women in film